The Hyde Park Firehouse is located along U.S. Route 9 in Hyde Park, New York. It was built in 1902 as the headquarters for the Eagle Engine and Rescue fire company, which later became part of the Hyde Park Fire Department and moved to newer quarters a block further up Route 9. Architects John O'Donnell and William J. Beardsley designed the building in a Renaissance Revival architectural style. It was added to the National Register of Historic Places in 1993.

The building currently serves as a local history museum for the Town of Hyde Park Historical Society. The historical society's museum there is open from June through October on Saturdays and Sundays, with a collection from the townspeople including historical items like the voting machine used by Roosevelt in 1932 when he ran against Herbert Hoover.

References

External links
Town of Hyde Park Historical Society Museum

Defunct fire stations in New York (state)
Fire stations on the National Register of Historic Places in New York (state)
Fire stations completed in 1902
U.S. Route 9
National Register of Historic Places in Dutchess County, New York
Renaissance Revival architecture in New York (state)
Historical society museums in New York (state)
History museums in New York (state)
Museums in Hyde Park, New York
1902 establishments in New York (state)